Maurice Toon is a paralympic boccia player from New Zealand competing mainly in category BC2  events.

Maurice competed in both the 2004 and 2008 Summer Paralympics.  At the 2004 games he competed in the individual event finishing first in his group but then lost in the quarter finals to Portugal's Fernando Ferreira, he was also a part of the New Zealand team that won a silver medal in the mixed team event. At the 2008 games he finished third in his group in the individual event missing out on qualifying for the quarter finals and was part of the New Zealand team that finished last in there group.

References

External links
 
 

Paralympic boccia players of New Zealand
Boccia players at the 2004 Summer Paralympics
Boccia players at the 2008 Summer Paralympics
Paralympic silver medalists for New Zealand
Living people
Year of birth missing (living people)
Medalists at the 2004 Summer Paralympics
Paralympic medalists in boccia